Behind the Beautiful Forevers: Life, Death, and Hope in a Mumbai Undercity is a non-fiction book written by the Pulitzer Prize-winner Katherine Boo in 2012. It won the National Book Award and the Los Angeles Times Book Prize among many others.  It has also been adapted into a play by David Hare in 2014, shown on National Theatre Live in 2015.
The book describes a present-day slum of Mumbai, India, named Annawadi, and located near the Chhatrapati Shivaji International Airport. It follows the interconnected lives of several residents, including a young trash picker, a female "slumlord," and a college student.  The author is an American woman who often visited Mumbai with her husband, who is from the area and had a job in the city.

Storyline
Annawadi is a slum created on land belonging to the Mumbai Airport. It was settled initially by migrant workers who had come to work on the airport in 1991 and stayed behind. The workers reclaimed a piece of airport land that was marshy and otherwise unusable. It quickly grew into a sprawling, densely inhabited zone of makeshift shacks, filled primarily with recent migrants to Mumbai from all over India and Pakistan. Ethnically, it is a mixture of many different groups and languages. Boo got to know the people there during the course of three years and in this work writes about the daily stresses and problems that inhabitants must contend with, such as poverty, hunger, disease, dirt, ethnic strife, violence, the constant fear that the airport authority will bulldoze their homes since they are technically there illegally, corruption, fatigue, weather, and the interpersonal conflicts that are augmented by being forced to live in close quarters with many others. She focuses on people such as Sunil, a stunted orphan who is a garbage picker; Abdul, a second generation garbage picker; Fatima, an emotionally troubled woman with one leg who dreams of a different life; Manju, who is trying to become the first female resident of Annawadi to graduate from college, and her mother, Asha, who is trying to attain the role of "slumlord", giving her access to power, money, and respect, but at the price of becoming part of the corruption around her. One of the central dramas around which the book centers is the self-immolation of Fatima, who then makes a false statement to the police that it was the fault of Abdul, his sister, and his father.

Background
Katherine Boo chose Annawadi to study because the scale of this "sumpy plug of slum" bordering a lake of sewage was small, and its location was fraught with possibilities. Annawadi sits beside the road to the Mumbai airport, on "a stretch where new India and old India collided and made new India late," as Boo explains in her introduction. The author has noted that she does not see the characters in the book as a representation of Indian people as a whole. They do not encompass what life is like for all people in Annawadi. Furthermore, the author sees herself in each character. Each one of them is undergoing struggles that they must learn to overcome.

Awards and honors
2012 National Book Award, winner, Nonfiction category.
2012 National Book Critics Circle Award, finalist, Nonfiction category.
2012 Samuel Johnson Prize, shortlist.
2012 Guardian First Book Award, shortlist.
2012 The New York Times best seller
2012 Salon What to Read Awards
2012 Los Angeles Times Book Prize (Current Interest)
2013 PEN/John Kenneth Galbraith Award, winner.
2013 Helen Bernstein Book Award for Excellence in Journalism, winner.

Editions

People depicted
Abdul is a boy in his mid to late teens and a second generation garbage picker. He is the family breadwinner, having taken up the void left when his father's illness left him unable to work. Abdul is accused (along with one of his sisters and his father) of Fatima's death. He is one of the main characters of the book.
Zehrunisa is Abdul's mother, a long-suffering, hard-working woman.
Karam is Abdul's father and too sick to work; he is also accused of Fatima's death.
Kehkashan is Abdul's sister and is accused of driving Fatima to suicide.
Mirchi is Abdul's younger brother who goes to school and is in the ninth grade.
Asha is the mother of Manju. She is the ruthless unofficial slumlord of Annawadi. A slumlord is a "person chosen by local politicians and police officers to run the settlement according to the authorities' interests." She is actually a great rarity in India, for female slumlords are not common in the least bit. Usually if a woman is in power it is attributed to the success of her husband; she is considered a stand in. Asha, contrary to most women, holds her own, while her husband does little. She is the mother of three children and has taken care of the household for the most part by herself. Many of her neighbors do not even think of her as a wife. Asha has made her living by being manipulative. She creates problems or makes problems seem larger than they really are and then makes people pay her to fix those problems. Even though she herself started at the bottom, she is not sympathetic in the least bit when people need her help, even when those people are friends. Her logic is that everybody is afforded the same opportunities, so what is the point in giving back to her community? She has an "every man for himself" logic.
Manju is Asha's teenaged daughter. She is trying to become the first female resident of Annawadi to graduate from college. Manju, unlike her mother, is a very sweet girl who cares a great deal about the feelings of the people surrounding her. She stresses this to her best friend Meena during their late night meetings. In response to this quality of Manju's, Asha encourages Manju to grow a tougher skin. This contrast in both characters' beliefs causes an uneasiness inside in the household.
Rahul is Asha's son, friends with Mirchi, goes to school, and also does some work at the hotel.
Mahadeo is Asha's husband and a drunkard.
Finnegan Courtney is the current slumlord of Annawadi and is in direct competition with Asha. He is generally regarded as a nice man and is losing his taste for power after years of dedicated service to the slum.
Sunil is an adolescent boy who was kicked out of the orphanage across the street from Annawadi because Sister Paulette decided that any boy over the age of 11 was simply "too much to handle". Thus, Sunil was introduced to the harsh life of living on the streets. Sunil's younger sister Sunita refused to live at the orphanage without him, so he took on the responsibility of caring for her as well. Sunil went back and forth between the orphanage and Annawadi. "He was therefore used to the transition: accustoming himself to scavenging work, to rats that emerged from the woodpile to bite him as he slept, and to a state of almost constant hunger." Sunil struggled a great deal with his size. "He looked closer to nine years old than to twelve, a fact that pained him on a masculine level". While Sunil knew that he wanted to eat to be satisfied; he knew even more that he wanted to eat to grow, to be bigger than his sister, to look like a man. Unfortunately, Sunil's body had stopped growing for a spell. "To jumpstart his system, he saw he'd have to become a better scavenger."
Sunita is Sunil's younger sister. She is taller than he is, much to his chagrin.
Fatima is a one-legged woman from the slum who lived next door to Abdul and his family. She got into an argument with Zehrunisa and then set herself on fire (eventually dying from her injuries) and blamed Abdul, Kehkashan and Karam for it.
Meena is Manju's friend who committed suicide with rat poison. Was also the first girl born in Annawadi.
Kalu is a homeless thief with tuberculosis. He was Abdul's friend and also briefly worked with Sunil. He was violently murdered at the airport, but his death was attributed to tuberculosis. "Official" cause of death, determined without autopsy, was TB.
Sonu is a garbage picker who is considered one of the most virtuous boys in Annawadi.
Sanjay is a garbage picker who stands out due to his height and beauty. He witnessed Kalu's murder and ended up committing suicide.
Subhash Sawant is the elected official (Corporator) of Ward 76, which includes Annawadi. He lied about his caste (saying it was lower) to qualify as Corporator of the Ward, due to quota requirements.
Mr. Kamble is the video shed owner, while also being in desperate need of a new heart valve. He visits Asha many times throughout the book, much to her annoyance.
Sister Paulette is a Christian woman who runs a children's home and also has many corrupt dealings.

See also
 Poverty in India
 Pavement dwellers
 Corruption in India
 Black money in India
 Political corruption
 Mafia raj
 Socio-economic issues in India
 Psychological resilience

References

Books about Mumbai
2012 non-fiction books
Books about poverty
Random House books
National Book Award for Nonfiction winning works
Helen Bernstein Book Award for Excellence in Journalism